Alpha 6 is a science fiction anthology edited by American writer Robert Silverberg, first published in 1976.

Contents
Introduction by Robert Silverberg
"The Lost Continent" by Norman Spinrad
"Light of Other Days" by Bob Shaw
"The Secret of Old Custard" by John Sladek
"Down among the Dead Men" by William Tenn
"With These Hands" by C.M. Kornbluth
"Short in the Chest" by Idris Seabright
"Brown Robert" by Terry Carr
"The Food Farm" by Kit Reed
"An Honorable Death" by Gordon R. Dickson
"Man of Parts" by Horace L. Gold
"Painwise" by James Tiptree

References
 Goodreads listing for Alpha 6
 MIT Science Fiction Society's Library Pinkdex Entry for Alpha 6

1976 anthologies
Science fiction anthologies
Robert Silverberg anthologies